The 2004 Russian football season, saw CSKA Moscow competed in the Russian Premier League, Russian Cup and the UEFA Champions League.

Season events
At the end of the previous season, Artur Jorge was announced as CSKA's new manager for the 2004 season.

Squad

Out on loan

Transfers

Winter

In:

Out:

Summer

In:

Out:

Competitions

Super Cup

Premier League

Results by round

Results

League table

Russian Cup

2003-04

2004-05

Round 16 took place during the 2005 season.

UEFA Champions League

Qualifying rounds

Group stages

Progressed to the UEFA Cup Round of 32 during the 2005 season.

Statistics

Appearances and goals

|-
|colspan="14"|Players that left CSKA Moscow on loan during the season:
|-
|colspan="14"|Players who appeared for CSKA Moscow no longer at the club:

|}

Goal Scorers

Disciplinary Record

References

Results

PFC CSKA Moscow seasons
CSKA Moscow